Shahpur District was a district in current day Pakistan from 1893, during the British Raj, till 1960. From 1893 to 1914 Shahpur was the district headquarters. In 1914 the district headquarters were moved from Shahpur to Sargodha, although the district continued to be known as Shahpur. In 1960 the Sargodha District was created and Shahpur District became Shahpur Tehsil.

History
The Shahpur district was one of the six districts of the Rawalpindi Division. It was divided into two equal parts by the river Jhelum, the western half constituting the Khushab tehsil, while the cis-Jhelum portion was subdivided into two tehsils also nearly equal in area, the Bhera tehsil to the east, and the Shahpur tehsil in the middle.

Four census were conducted between 1855 and 1891 by the British. The proportion percent of total populations returned as belonging to the chief religions at successive censuses is as follows.

Percentage of total populations

References

Districts of Punjab, Pakistan
Districts of British India